Piccadilly Pub was a chain of casual dining restaurants headquartered in the US state of Massachusetts. The first Piccadilly Pub restaurant was opened by William C. Martin in 1973 in the town of Westborough, Massachusetts.

The chain offered a menu of American cuisine, with particular emphasis on seafood such as fish and chips, New England clam chowder, fried clams, lobster, scallops, and shrimp.

Other items served included ribs, steaks, grilled honey lime island chicken salad, and Oreo cookie ice cream pie.

As of 2001, the chain had 11 locations. At its peak, the chain had 13 locations, all in Massachusetts and Connecticut, but at the time it went out of business it had nine locations. All locations closed on February 5, 2012.

Locations

Auburn
Foxborough 
Franklin
Marlborough
North Attleborough
North Reading
Randolph
Sturbridge
Tewksbury
Westborough 
West Springfield
Wethersfield, Connecticut
Worcester
Peabody

Sale of operations
Piccadilly Pubs was acquired by Massachusetts Pub Group in 2008. Repechage Investments LLC, which controlled Piccadilly Pub through its Massachusetts Pub Group, filed for Chapter 11 bankruptcy protection in 2011. 

The Worcester Telegram & Gazette reports that "Piccadilly Pub's assets have now been acquired by FranWorks Group of Calgary, Alberta, Canada."

Closing
On February 5, 2012 an internal memo to all employees circulated that informed them that all remaining restaurant locations would be closing indefinitely, and that further information would be disclosed in a public announcement shortly. 

On February 6, 2012 all restaurants remained closed, with the following memo on the door: “Piccadilly Pub Restaurants have temporarily closed. Currently, a date has not been set for a re-opening.”

By 2013, some Piccadilly restaurants had opened under new names, including The Pic and Bentley Pub.

References

External links
 Official website
 
 

Restaurants in Massachusetts
Restaurants established in 1973
1973 establishments in Massachusetts
2012 disestablishments in the United States